The 1945 Tulsa Golden Hurricane team represented the University of Tulsa during the 1945 college football season. In their fifth and final year under head coach Henry Frnka, the Golden Hurricane compiled an 8–2 record during the regular season with losses against undefeated eventual Big Ten Conference champion Indiana and undefeated Oklahoma A&M, a team that went on to win the 1946 Sugar Bowl. Tulsa closed the season with a loss to Georgia in the 1946 Oil Bowl in Houston.

Schedule

References

Tulsa
Tulsa Golden Hurricane football seasons
Tulsa Golden Hurricane football